Anna Michaela Ebba Electra von Hausswolff (born 6 September 1986) is a Swedish singer, songwriter, musician, composer, and pipe organist. She is known for her gothic-styled music, usually accompanied by the pipe organ. Von Hausswolff's music has received praise from music critics, though it also caused controversy from Catholic groups.

Early life
Born in Gothenburg, Sweden, von Hausswolff is the daughter of avant-garde sound artist Carl Michael von Hausswolff. She was a student of architecture at Chalmers University of Technology.

Career

Von Hausswolff released her debut single, "Track of Time", on 5 February 2010, followed by the debut album Singing from the Grave. The album was warmly received by the Swedish press. She played the Way Out West Festival in 2009. In March 2010 she opened for Tindersticks on three occasions and toured Brazil with Taken by Trees and Taxi Taxi! Then in 2011 she opened for Lykke Li thrice, and also for M.Ward at the Royal Dramatic Theatre in Stockholm.  She has played at several big festivals in Sweden such as Peace and Love, Storsjöyran, Way Out West, Arvika, and Made Festival.
Hausswolff is noted for her expressive voice and her live performances, and is sometimes compared to Diamanda Galás.

On July 9, 2013, Ceremony was released in North America by Other Music Recording Co., and Anna von Hausswolff played her debut US show on July 10 at Glasslands Gallery in Brooklyn. The album received strong support from National Public Radio's Bob Boilen, who said "Von Hausswolff's voice possesses the power to soar with those mighty pipes and still hold tight to delicate, personal emotions. I hope to find one album like Ceremony every year — a rare, thoughtful, inspiring record for a night on the couch or a candlelit evening — and now I've got one for 2013." She was also featured on NPR's Weekend Edition, PRI's The World, WNYC Soundcheck, the New York Times, Pitchfork and more.

Von Hausswolff released her fourth album Dead Magic, produced with Sunn O))) producer Randall Dunn, on City Slang records on 2 March 2018. The album features songs recorded on the 20th-century pipe organ at Copenhagen's rococo-style Marble Church. Von Hausswolff hopes that the album causes listeners to accept mystery and ambiguity in an "extremely materialistic society where everything needs to be explained."

All Thoughts Fly is the fifth album, recorded the pipe organ of Örgryte New Church in Gothenburg. The organ is a Swedish replica of the Arp Schnitger organ in Germany. It is the largest organ tuned in quarter-comma meantone temperament in the world.

Anna von Hausswolff appears on the Sunn O))) record Metta, Benevolence. BBC 6Music: Live on the Invitation of Mary Anne Hobbs (2021)

Anna has collaborated with Wolves in the Throne Room, Swans, Sunn O))), and Yann Tiersen.

Artistry

Von Hausswolff's gothic-style music is described as "art pop, drone, and post-metal", with "a juxtaposition of dark and bright". The Guardian has described it as "funeral pop".  Her 2015 release, The Miraculous, is noted for its "gothic splendour". Dead Magic shows a "brighter, poppier beat". Her vocals are similar to Nico, Diamanda Galás, Peruvian soprano Yma Sumac, and are compared to Kate Bush and A Kiss In The Dreamhouse-era Siouxsie Sioux. Her music is associated with the Krautrock genre with odes to Einstürzende Neubauten and Swans.

The pipe organ features heavily in her work. In an interview with The National about the album, she spoke to the physically demanding nature of the instrument, "You are working with your hands and feet, and you have all these stops that you are pulling in and out to make flute sounds, or maybe trumpet sounds. If you are playing fast it’s like dancing – you have to move the entire body to make it work.”

Controversy 
On 7 December 2021, von Hausswolff cancelled her planned concert at the Notre-Dame de Bon-Port in Nantes, France, following boycott demands from fundamentalist Catholic groups. Deeming her music "Satanic", the protestors blocked the church's entrance. Complaints against von Hausswolff include her 2009 song "Pills", which features the lyrics "I made love with the devil". However, the scheduled concerts were instrumental on organ without lyrics. The concert, organized by Le Lieu unique, had been scheduled with approval from the Roman Catholic Diocese of Nantes. On 9 December 2021, a concert planned at Saint-Eustache church in Paris was also threatened and rescheduled to the Protestant Unie de l'Etoile church, a location kept secret until the last moment except for ticket holders. In a press release, the priest of Saint-Eustache explained that show was cancelled due to security reasons, and not due to the content of von Hausswolff's work. Organisers for von Hausswolff and the Syndicat des musiques actuelles (SMA) lamented the lack of political support for the holding of the concert. The organiser and the spectators of the canceled concert in Nantes have announced intentions to file a complaint against the fundamentalists for obstructing freedom of expression. Von Hausswolff has denied the accusations of Satanism.

On 13 December 2021, a show at the Dominican Order Saint-Dominique de Bruxelles church in Brussels also received threats. The concerts, which were sold out, nonetheless took place but under police protection. Approximately 100 people turned out to protest, but were more peaceful than the protestors in France.

In 2022 her music was performed at the Union Chapel in London on the opening night of "Organ Reframed". The London Contemporary Orchestra played her music and that of Ipek Gorgun, Abul Mogard and von Hausswolff.

Discography

Albums

Studio albums 
 Singing from the Grave (2010)
 Ceremony (2013)
 The Miraculous (2015)
 Dead Magic (2018)
 All Thoughts Fly (2020)

Live albums 
 Live at Montreux Jazz Festival (2022)

Extended plays
 Track of Time (2010)
 Källan (Prototype) (2014)
 Källan (Betatype) (2016)

References

1986 births
Living people
21st-century Swedish musicians
21st-century women musicians
21st-century organists
Art pop musicians
Gothic rock musicians
Musicians from Gothenburg
Swedish organists
Swedish nobility
Women organists
Southern Lord Records artists
City Slang artists
Anna
Religious controversies in music
Controversies in Sweden